Olena Dzybchuk (born 19 May 1985) is a Ukrainian rhythmic gymnast.

Personal life 
Dzybchuk was born on May 19, 1985, in the city of Simferopol. She was engaged in rhythmic gymnastics at the Dynamo Sports School in Simferopol. She trained under Lyubov Serebryanskaya, later under Oksana Rizatdinova. Later she joined the Deriugins school in Kyiv.

Career 
In 2001, as part of the Ukrainian team, she won the gold medal at the World Championship in Madrid in the team all-around.

In 2002, as part of the Ukrainian group, she won gold with 5 ribbons at the World Championships in New Orleans.

In 2004, Dzybchuk competed at the Olympic Games in Athens as a member of the Ukrainian group.  In the group all-around the Ukrainian team, which was also represented by Mariya Bilaya, Yuliya Chernova, Yelyzaveta Karabash, Inga Kozhokina and Oksana Paslas, took 9th place in qualification and did not reach the final. Ukraine scored 42.150 points and lost by 2.450 points the 8th and last place for the final to Spain.

References 

Living people
1985 births
Ukrainian rhythmic gymnasts
Gymnasts at the 2004 Summer Olympics
Olympic gymnasts of Ukraine
Sportspeople from Simferopol
Medalists at the Rhythmic Gymnastics World Championships